The Regional Development Corporation is a crown corporation in the Canadian province of New Brunswick.  It administers a number of programs charged with promoting economic development in the various regions of New Brunswick.

Crown corporations of New Brunswick